Estoy Loca  is an album by Puerto Rican merengue musician Ashley.

Track listing 
 "Estoy Loca"
 "Soy Tu Muneca"
 "Reggaemaniaca"
 "Ahi NA'Mas"
 "Estoy Loca Por El Reggaeton"
 "MaMa No Quiere (Cole)"
 "Gracias"
 "IM So Crazy"
 "Cole En Merengue"
 "Esoty Loca Karaoke Vers."

Ashley (singer) albums
2003 albums